Agrupación Deportiva San Juan is a Spanish sports club team based in Pamplona in the autonomous community of Navarre. Founded in 1962, it plays in Segunda División RFEF – Group 2. Its stadium is Estadio San Juan with a capacity of 1,000 seaters. Sports sections includes football and futsal as well as other.

Season to season 

2 seasons in Segunda División RFEF
28 seasons in Tercera División

References

External links
Official website 
Futbolme team profile  

Football clubs in Navarre
Sport in Pamplona
Association football clubs established in 1962
1962 establishments in Spain
Multi-sport clubs in Spain